Doina Robu (née Ciucanu; born 22 July 1967) is a retired Romanian rower who won a silver medal at the 1992 Olympics. She also won two gold, one silver and one bronze medal at the world championships between 1986 and 1993. She is married to the Olympic rower Valentin Robu. She competed at the 1990 World Rowing Championships under her married name.

References

External links
 
 
 
 

1967 births
Living people
Romanian female rowers
Sportspeople from Piatra Neamț
Rowers at the 1988 Summer Olympics
Rowers at the 1992 Summer Olympics
Rowers at the 1996 Summer Olympics
Olympic silver medalists for Romania
Olympic rowers of Romania
Olympic medalists in rowing
World Rowing Championships medalists for Romania
Medalists at the 1992 Summer Olympics